Carwyn Penny (born 17 November 1998) is a Welsh rugby union player who plays for Dragons as a fullback. He was a Wales under-20 international.

Penny made his debut for the Dragons regional team in 2020 having previously played for the Gloucester, Dragons academy and Dragons transitional side.

References

External links 
Carwyn Penny profile

Welsh rugby union players
Dragons RFC players
Rugby union fullbacks
Living people
1998 births
Gloucester Rugby players
Cornish Pirates players